

Referensi

Lists of governors
Governors of East Java